Blues Forever is an album by Muhal Richard Abrams released by the Italian label Black Saint  in 1982 and featuring performances of seven of Abrams compositions by an eleven-member big band.

Critical reception
The Allmusic review by Ron Wynn awarded the album 4 stars stating, "Although every arrangement doesn't click, the band successfully romps and stomps through enough cuts to show that the big band sound doesn't just mean "ghost" groups recreating dusty numbers from the 1930s and 1940s." The Rolling Stone Jazz Record Guide called the album "Abrams's crowning achievement". The Penguin Guide to Jazz described it as "a sparkling big-band date with some demanding charts and a vivid sub-current of the blues".

Track listing 
 All compositions by Muhal Richard Abrams
 "Ancient and Future Reflections" – 6:46
 "Du King" (Dedicated to Duke Ellington) – 2:00
 "Chambea" – 7:30
 "Duet for One World" – 4:53
 "Blues Forever" – 9:01
 "Cluster for Many Worlds" – 5:02
 "Quartet to Quartet" – 7:09

Personnel 
 Muhal Richard Abrams – piano, conductor
 Baikida Carroll – trumpet, flugelhorn
 Craig Harris – trombone
 Wallace Leroy McMillan – baritone saxophone, flute
 Jimmy Vass – alto saxophone, flute
 Eugene Ghee – tenor saxophone, clarinet
 Vincent Chancey – French horn
 Howard Johnson – tuba, baritone saxophone
 Jean-Paul Bourelly – guitar
 Michael Logan – bass
 Andrew Cyrille – drums

References 

1982 albums
Muhal Richard Abrams albums
Black Saint/Soul Note albums